Things Here Are Different is the first album by the American singer-songwriter Jill Sobule, released in 1990. It contains the singles "Living Color" and "Too Cool to Fall in Love".

Track listing
All songs written by Jill Sobule except as noted.
"Living Color" – 4:04
"Sad Beauty" – 3:32
"Too Cool to Fall in Love" (Holland, Melamed, Sobule) – 3:51
"Life Goes on Without You" – 4:20
"Pilar (Things Here Are Different)" – 3:21
"Evian" (Eaton, Jacobson, Sobule) – 3:16
"So Kind" (Bunch, Sobule) – 3:46
"Tell Me Your Dreams" (Eaton) – 4:01
"Disinformation" – 3:38
"Golden Cage" – 3:56
"The Gifted Child" – 2:00

The single, "Too Cool to Fall in Love" peaked at  17 on the Billboard Adult Contemporary chart in fall 1990.

Personnel
Jill Sobule – guitar, vocals
Valentina Charlap-Evans – violin, viola
Carole Cowan – violin
Emily Faxon – violin
Eric Jacobson – synthesizer, piano, glockenspiel, keyboards, recorder, handclapping
Sid McGinnis – guitar
Michael Rhodes – bass guitar, guitar
Todd Rundgren – guitar
Steve Satten – trumpet
Susan Seligman – cello
Michael Shrieve – percussion, drums
Geraldo Velez – percussion, bongos, conga, handclapping

Production
Producer: Todd Rundgren
Engineer: Todd Rundgren
Mixing: Todd Rundgren
Mastering: Greg Calbi
Project coordinator: Lee Dannay
String arrangements: Eric Jacobson
Photography: Michael Miller
Make-up: Jeanine Greville-Morris
Stylists: Susan Tobman, Justin Ware

References 

Jill Sobule albums
1990 debut albums
Albums produced by Todd Rundgren
MCA Records albums